Birk Engstrøm (born 24 March 1950) is a former Norwegian football striker.

He first played for Ålgård FK, but played mainly for Bryne, most notably in the Norwegian Premier League between 1976 and 1983.

He was selected once for the Norwegian national team, in 1977.

References
100% Fotball - Norwegian Premier League statistics

1950 births
Living people
Norwegian footballers
Norway international footballers
Ålgård FK players
Bryne FK players

Association football forwards